Kim Min-ho (born 13 May 1985) is a South Korean football player.

Club career 

Kim was a draftee from Konkuk University, joining Seongnam Ilhwa for the 2007 season, making a number of intermittent appearances throughout the season.  He then moved to the Chunnam Dragons but again only made intermittent appearances in a two and a half year spell for his new club.  In the summer of 2010, Kim transferred to Daegu FC, playing his first game for his new club as a substitute in a 3–1 loss to Suwon Samsung Bluewings.

Club career statistics

References

External links
 

1985 births
Living people
Association football forwards
South Korean footballers
Seongnam FC players
Jeonnam Dragons players
Daegu FC players
K League 1 players